Black River is the capital of St. Elizabeth Parish, in southwestern Jamaica. It developed as a port around the mouth of the river of the same name. Today the city is a centre of environmental tourism and a gateway to the Treasure Beach resort area. Treasure Beach and Crane Beach are to the south-east, with Luana Beach to the west. In the 18th and early 19th centuries, it was a thriving sugar port with a market for African slaves.

Growing prosperity in the sugar and lumber trade led to the construction of several warehouses. Some have been adapted as restaurants or as bases for eco-tours of the river.

History

Black River is one of the oldest European towns in the island of Jamaica, being shown on John Sellers' 1685 map. It was designed by the Leyden brothers of England, three wealthy men who were substantial land proprietors in the area.

In 1773 Black River replaced Lacovia, 19 miles to the north-east, as the capital of St. Elizabeth. Soon after it became the main commercial, economic and transshipment centre of the parish. By the early 1900s, it was second only to Kingston in economic importance on the island.

In the 18th and 19th centuries, Black River was a busy seaport for the lucrative logwood trade and for exports of rum, pimento and cattle skins from the nearby Holland, Vineyard, and Fullerswood plantations.

Into the early 19th century, slaves from Africa and other Caribbean islands were landed here and sold at auction at Farquharson Wharf (originally Town Wharf). This wharf still stands. In 2007, the United Kingdom celebrated the 200th anniversary of the Slave Trade Act 1807, which ended the African slave trade in its colonies.

A monument was installed at Black River in 2007 to memorialize the slaves killed in the Zong massacre of 1781. More than 132 slaves were thrown overboard at sea from the Zong. They were sacrificed by the crew purportedly to save the remainder and the crew because of a shortage of water on board. The Zong finally landed at Black River. Its owners later sued for insurance claims for the slaves who had been killed, and the case was litigated in 1783 in Britain. The court rejected the owners' claim, as it was shown that the crew had made navigation errors that kept the ship at sea and threatened its supplies. Abolitionists publicized it, and the case became a catalyst for continuing efforts to abolish slavery. Britain abolished slavery in its empire in 1833.

As a major sea port, Black River became a commercial center on the south coast of Jamaica. Due to its wealth, in 1893 this was the first town in Jamaica to be lit by electricity. Ten years later, in 1903 it was the first city on the island to have automobiles. A telephone system was installed 10 years after the instrument was invented.

References

External links

 Aerial view.

Populated places established in the 17th century
Populated places in Saint Elizabeth Parish